Warren Martin Hern, M.D., M.P.H., Ph.D. (born 1938) is an American physician best known for performing late terminations of pregnancy. In 1973, he founded Boulder Abortion Clinic in Boulder, Colorado. Hern was a founding member of the National Abortion Federation, and authored Abortion Practice, a comprehensive text on operating and evaluating abortion facilities.  He and doctors LeRoy Carhart, Shelley Sella, and Susan Robinson were the subject of the 2013 documentary After Tiller about the four providers openly advertising later abortions in the United States after the 2009 assassination of George Tiller.

Background
Hern took his B.A. at the University of Colorado, in 1961.  He triple-majored in Speech, Anthropology, and Chemistry.  He attended medical school at University of Colorado, taking his M.D. in 1965.  He took his M.P.H. degree at the University of North Carolina School of Public Health, in 1971, and his Ph.D. in epidemiology from the same school in 1988.

He has been board certified in Preventive Medicine since 1978.

In 1973, Hern was asked to help found a private, non-profit abortion clinic in Boulder, Colorado. After his position was eliminated, Hern entered into private practice, creating the Boulder Abortion Clinic in 1975.

Academic appointments
Hern holds the following academic appointments
 Professor Adjunct, Department of Anthropology, University of Colorado, Boulder 
 Associate Professor Adjunct, Department of Anthropology and Sociology, University of Colorado at Denver
 Assistant Clinical Professor, Department of Obstetrics Gynecology 
 Associate Clinical Professor, Department of Family Practice 
 Associate Clinical Professor, Department of Preventive Medicine and Biometrics: University of Colorado Health Sciences Center

Non-abortion work

Hern travels regularly to Peru, where he works as a volunteer providing medical care to the Shipibo tribe.

Violence against Hern and his clinic

Hern's clinic has been the target of numerous vandalisms and threats, including gunshots fired through his office window.  He has been stalked and threatened.  His family has been threatened as well.

Solidarity with George Tiller

Hern expressed outrage over the May 31, 2009 killing of George Tiller, a doctor who offered similar services, in Wichita.  In the aftermath of Tiller's murder, Hern's clinic has continued to receive threats.

Published works
   Because of anti-abortion threats and harassment, Lippincott took the book out of print in 1989 and destroyed several hundred copies of the hardcover edition. Dr. Hern subsequently obtained the copyright, formed a publishing company (Alpenglo Graphics), and published a soft cover edition of Abortion Practice in order to keep the book available to those who need it.

References

External links
Biography of Warren Hern, M.D. at Boulder Abortion Clinic website
Did I Violate the Partial Birth Abortion Ban? by Warren Hern, Slate, Oct. 22, 2003.
The Last Abortion Doctor by John H. Richardson, "Esquire" Aug. 5, 2009.

Physicians from Colorado
American abortion providers
American abortion-rights activists
1938 births
Living people